Freienbach SBB railway station is a railway station in the Swiss canton of Schwyz and municipality of Freienbach. The station is located on the Lake Zurich left-bank railway line, owned by the Swiss Federal Railways (SBB). It is an intermediate stop on Zurich S-Bahn service S8, between Zurich and Pfaffikon SZ.

Freienbach SBB station should not be confused with the nearby Freienbach SOB railway station, which is on the Pfäffikon SZ–Arth-Goldau line.

References

External links 
 
 

Freienbach
Freienbach
Freienbach